The  is an archaeological site with the ruins of a late Jōmon period settlement located in what is now the village of Shintō, Gunma Prefecture in the northern Kantō region of Japan. The site was designated a National Historic Site of Japan in 1987.

Overview
The site is located at the southeastern foot of Mōunt Soma, one of the outliers of Mount Haruna in central Gunma. It was discovered in 1989 in conjunction with an agricultural land improvement project. As the site is located on a slope, it was found to be in a relatively good and undisturbed condition. In an excavation survey conducted from 1989 to 1990, well-preserved foundations of numerous pit dwellings, tombs, and artifacts such as Jōmon pottery shards, stone tools, clay figurines, magatama, candle-shaped earthen lamps, and 577 earthenware earrings were excavated. It was determined from these artifacts that this was a large-scale settlement from the first half of the late Jōmon period (approximately 2500 to 3000 years ago). Of particular interest were the earthenware earrings, many of which were pulley-shaped, and colored in red or black. A dogū clay figurine depicting a person wearing these earrings was also discovered. The presence of so many examples indicates that this location may have been a production site, and that the earrings were used as trade goods with other regions.

In 1992, 1950 pieces of the excavated items were designated as a National Important Cultural Property., and the ruins were designated as a National Historic Site in 2000. The site is now a park, and the excavated remains are stored in the nearby , established in 1992. The museum and site are located about 25 minutes by car from the Maebashi Interchange on the Kan'etsu Expressway.

See also
List of Historic Sites of Japan (Gunma)

References

External links
 Shintō village official site 

Jōmon period
History of Gunma Prefecture
Shintō, Gunma
Archaeological sites in Japan
Historic Sites of Japan
Museums in Gunma Prefecture